The Bamboo Curtain is a Cold War political demarcation between the communist states of East Asia, particularly the People's Republic of China, and the capitalist and non-communist states of East, South, and Southeast Asia. To the north and northwest lay the communist states of China, the Soviet Union, North Vietnam, North Korea, and Mongolian People's Republic. To the south and east lay the capitalist and non-communist countries of India, Pakistan, Japan, Indonesia, Malaysia, Singapore, the Philippines, Thailand, Taiwan, South Korea, British Hong Kong, and Portuguese Macau. Before the Indochina Wars the non-communist bloc included French Indochina and its successor states South Vietnam, Laos, and Cambodia. However, after the wars the new countries of Vietnam, Laos, and Democratic Kampuchea became communist states. In particular, following the Korean War, the Korean Demilitarized Zone became an important symbol of this Asian division (though the term Bamboo Curtain itself is rarely used in that specific context).

The colorful term Bamboo Curtain was derived from Iron Curtain, a term used widely in Europe from the mid 1940s to the late 1980s to refer to that region's communist boundaries. It was used less often than Iron Curtain in part because while the latter remained relatively static for over 40 years, the Bamboo Curtain shifted frequently and was somewhat less precise. It was also a less accurate description of the political situation in Asia because of the lack of cohesion within the East Asian communist bloc, which resulted in the Sino-Soviet split. During the Cold War, communist governments in Mongolia, Vietnam, and Laos were allies of the Soviet Union, though they sometimes cooperated with China, while Pol Pot's Cambodian regime was loyal to China. After the Korean War, North Korea avoided taking sides between the Soviets and China. (Since the end of a communist bloc in Asia, North Korea remains on good terms with both Russia and China, although relations between the countries have been strained in modern times.)

During the Cultural Revolution in China, the Chinese authorities put sections of the curtain under a lock-down of sorts, forbidding entry into or passage out of the country without permission from the Chinese government. Many would-be refugees attempting to flee to capitalist countries were prevented from escaping. Occasional relaxations led to several waves of refugees into the British crown colony of Hong Kong.

Improved relations between China and the United States during the later years of the Cold War rendered the term more or less obsolete, except when it referred to the Korean Peninsula and the divide between allies of the US and allies of the USSR in Southeast Asia. Today, the demilitarized zone separating North and South Korea is typically described as the DMZ. Bamboo Curtain is used most often to refer to the enclosed borders and economy of Burma (though this began to open in 2010). The Bamboo Curtain has since given way to the business model called the bamboo network.

See also
 Containment
 Domino theory
 Iron Curtain

References

20th century in Korea
Cold War history of China
History of Laos (1945–present)
20th century in Myanmar
20th century in Bhutan
20th century in Pakistan
Cold War terminology
Political metaphors
Euphemisms